Pritom Ahmed is a Bangladeshi-British singer-songwriter, actor and music composer. In Bangladesh he is the only singer with 13 solo albums of his own lyrics and composition. His music focuses on class stratification, contemporary urban life, socio-economic, 2013 Shahbag protests and human rights of Bangladesh.

Ahmed has had several acting roles in British and Hollywood productions, including featured roles in The Crown and A Very British Scandal.

Notable Songs 
His famous songs are Balika, Red Rose, Bhalo Theko, Bhaiya, Cholo Palai, Vote for Thot, Emon Keno, Shongshar, Ghor, Cholo Ekshathe Buro hoi, Separation, Pashanpurir Golpo, Dukkho Shari Shari, and many more.

Albums

Solo album
 Dui Inchee Shukh Chai, 2002
 Cholo Palai, 2004 
 Bhalobashar Michile Esho, 2006 
 Hello Bondhu, 2006 
 Slogaan, 2007 
 Tui Ki Amar Bondhu Hobi, 2008 
 Street Singer, 2009
 Bhalo Theko, 2014 
 Shahbag Calling Abar Ekattor 2013 
 Vote For Thot 2014 
 Bhaiya 2015 
 Copy Paste 2017 
 Soulmate 2020

Mixed album
 Jiboner joto chawa, 1999
 Onamika tumi, 1999
 Dour, 2004

Video album
 Cholo palai, 2004
 Balika, 2006
 BHAIYA, 2006

Filmography

References

External links
 
 

1976 births
Living people
Bangladeshi composers
21st-century Bangladeshi male singers
21st-century Bangladeshi singers
People from Dhaka
Laser Vision artists